The Sanctuary of the Visitation in Valinotto is a late-Baroque style, Roman Catholic sanctuary church located along the route SP138 in a rural farmland of Valinotto (or Vallinotto) near the town of Carignano in the Metropolitan City of Turin in the region of Piedmont, Italy. The small church, with its stunning hexagonal ribbed dome, was designed in 1738 by the prominent Piedmontese architect Bernardo Vittone.

History and description
A small hermitage at the site, dedicated to the Visitation of the Virgin Mary to her mother Elisabeth, was replaced by the present church. The Vittone church was commissioned by the jurist Antonio Faccio (owner of the Cascina del Valinotto and founder of the Opera Pia Faccio-Frichieri in Carignano). The interior, including its highly elaborate dome, was frescoed in 1738-1740 by Pier Francesco Guala.

In 2016, the church was reopened after a restoration sponsored by the Compagnia di San Paolo and under the guidance of Laura Salvetti Firpo, the architects Agostino Magnaghi, Fiorella Mitton, Antonino Mannina, and Doctor Carmen Rossi.

See also
 History of early modern period domes

References

Roman Catholic churches completed in 1738
18th-century Roman Catholic church buildings in Italy
Churches in the province of Turin
Bernardo Antonio Vittone buildings
Baroque church buildings in Piedmont
Church buildings with domes
Roman Catholic churches in Piedmont
Carignano